Dorian is a Turkish rock band from Istanbul . The band members are İlkin Kitapçı, Mehmet İncilli, Alex Tintaru, Afşar Yağcıoğlu and Burak Irmak.

History

Dorian was founded by İlkin Kitapçı, Kaya Ertanhan and Bahadır Çakır in 2000 at Istanbul/Turkey and found its final cast in 2002. After working with several professional musicians, step by step they found their own identity.

Different festivals and concerts gave them the possibility to present their own songs and covers to a faster-growing fan-crowd.
When they started to work on their first album Yeniden Hayata they continued to give concerts in bars until they finally concentrated totally on their album production.

They tried hard not to let the album be influenced by musicians who influenced the musicians themselves. A strong influence of drum & bass, acid jazz, anatolian and Islamic mysticism can be recognized instead.

Dorian took part in the 9. Efes Dark Roxy Muzik Gunleri (famous musical contest in Turkey) and won the special jury award with 20000 votes in the internet with their song Ruyadan. Between 2002 and 2005 they just worked on their album which led into an agreement with EMI Music in March 2005.

In April 2005, they started to record their album at ATM studios and decided to publish Bakma Yuzume as their first single of their album, which was released in September 2005.

Discography
Yeniden Hayata (2005)
Dorian (2014)

Turkish alternative rock groups
Musical groups from Istanbul
Turkish progressive rock groups
Musical groups established in 2000
Musical quintets